Acrocercops erebopa is a moth of the family Gracillariidae, known from Java, Indonesia. It was described by Edward Meyrick in 1936. The host plant for the species is an unidentified species of  Derris.

References

erebopa
Moths of Asia
Moths described in 1936